Kahurangi Peters (born 23 February 1994) is a New Zealand rugby league footballer who played for the New Zealand Warriors in the NRL Women's Premiership. 

Background
Born in Auckland, Peters is of Māori descent. Her older sisters, Hilda and Rona, are also New Zealand Test representatives.

Playing career
In 2013, Peters represented New Zealand at the 2013 Women's Rugby League World Cup.

On 9 November 2014, Peters played for New Zealand in their 12–8 win over Australia, alongside her sisters Hilda and Rona.

In 2017, she represented New Zealand at the 2017 Women's Rugby League World Cup.

On 1 August 2018, Peters joined the New Zealand Warriors NRL Women's Premiership team. In Round 1 of the 2018 NRL Women's season, she made her debut for the Warriors in a 10–4 win over the Sydney Roosters.

References

1994 births
Living people
New Zealand Māori rugby league players
New Zealand female rugby league players
New Zealand women's national rugby league team players
New Zealand Warriors (NRLW) players
Rugby league props